In model theory, a branch of mathematical logic, Chang's conjecture, attributed to Chen Chung Chang by , states that every model of type (ω2,ω1) for a countable language has an elementary submodel of type (ω1, ω). A model is of type (α,β) if it is of cardinality α and a unary relation is represented by a subset of cardinality β.

The axiom of constructibility implies that Chang's conjecture fails. Silver proved the consistency of Chang's conjecture from the consistency of an ω1-Erdős cardinal. Hans-Dieter Donder showed a weak version of the reverse implication: if CC is not only consistent but actually holds, then ω2 is ω1-Erdős in K.

More generally, Chang's conjecture for two pairs (α,β), (γ,δ) of cardinals is the claim
that every model of type (α,β) for a countable language has an elementary submodel of type (γ,δ). 

References

Model theory
Set theory
Conjectures